František Mašlán (born 19 February 1933 in Chornice, Czechoslovakia) is a Czech former ice hockey player who competed in the 1960 Winter Olympics.

References

External links
 

1933 births
Ice hockey players at the 1960 Winter Olympics
Living people
Olympic ice hockey players of Czechoslovakia
People from Svitavy District
Sportspeople from the Pardubice Region
HC Kometa Brno players
Czech ice hockey defencemen
Czechoslovak ice hockey defencemen
LHK Jestřábi Prostějov players